Amantis basilana is a species of praying mantis native to the Philippines.

References

basilana
Mantodea of Southeast Asia
Insects of the Philippines
Insects described in 1920